George Philip Rawick (December 8, 1929 – June 27, 1990) was an American academic, historian, and socialist, best known for his editorship of a 41-volume set of oral histories of former slaves, titled The American Slave: A Composite Autobiography. Rawick revolutionized the study of slavery in the 1970s with his work, as he viewed the testimony of former slaves to be as serious as documentary left by slaveholders. As a white Jewish American, his support of the Black freedom movement was unique. During his teenage years, he witnessed the systematic extermination of Jewish people by the Nazi regime in World War II. These events initially drew Rawick to Communist politics. His involvement in various leftist groups led him to travel to London, to work with C. L. R. James. In London he met with many prominent Black intellectuals, which caused him to study more about race and slavery.

Biography 
Rawick was born in 1929 in Brooklyn, New York, and died in 1990 in St. Louis, Missouri. He grew up in a community of first and second generation Jewish Americans. He was educated in the New York City public schools and graduated with a bachelor's degree at Oberlin College. Rawick became more invested in civil rights activism while at Oberlin College. Later in his studies at the university he started to feel betrayed by the institution, as he believed they had thrown away their abolitionist heritage by suppressing a local Black community. He subsequently earned a Ph.D. in history at the University of Wisconsin–Madison. He studied under Professor Merle Curti, who was one of the leading American historians of the era. Rawick completed his dissertation, The New Deal and Youth: The Civilian Conservation Corps, the National Youth Administration, and the American Youth Congress, in 1957: in that work, he contrasted the conservative, authoritarian, Army-run Civilian Conservation Corps with the leftist, democratically run National Youth Administration, which allowed him to discuss the often contradictory impulses underlying the New Deal generally.

Over his long career in academia, Rawick taught at Washington University in St. Louis, Wayne State University, State University of New York, the University of Chicago, and the University of Missouri-St. Louis, among others. Rawick held brief postings at Harvard University and Cornell University. Rawick produced very little academic writing in these positions, as he faced criticism from anti-radicals at the upper levels of academia because of his association with Marxist ideology.

Rawick was involved in leftist politics from his earliest days at Oberlin College, staking out a career as an anti-Stalinist socialist in the United States. He participated in a number of left organizations including the Communist Party, Correspondence Publishing Committee, Independent Socialist League, and Facing Reality. He was associated with the ideas of C. L. R. James and was co-author of a Facing Reality pamphlet, with C. L. R. James, Martin Glaberman, and William Gorman. He also wrote for the journal Radical America, which published his important essay, "Working Class Self Activity," in 1969.

Political affiliations 
Rawick became more politically active during his teen years. In either 1944 or 1945, he joined the American Youth for Democracy, which was directly associated with the Communist Party. His dive into Communist politics could be attributed to World War II, as his Jewish family stopped receiving letters from relatives in countries that were under Nazi control.

While attending Oberlin College, Rawick pursued civil rights activism. He joined a branch of the Communist Party in Lorain, Ohio. This city influenced Rawick's political ideology as it had a large Black working class. In 1948, Rawick heavily contributed to the Communist Party's support of Henry Wallace's Progressive Party presidential campaign. He was enthralled by the campaign's antiracist accomplishments and its eventual defeat. He then worked briefly for Vito Marcantonio in Washington, D.C., a congressman that was supported by the Communist Party for his Left inter-racialism political views. Rawick was later kicked out of the Communist Party for allegedly supporting male chauvinism and Jim Crow. The accusations stem from Rawick declining to dance with an African American woman at a Communist Party meeting in Cleveland. Rawick explained that he declined to dance because he did not know how to, which ultimately was not enough to overturn the decision.

In the early 1950s, Rawick joined the Independent Socialist League. It was a small collection of radicals led by Max Shachtman. Rawick was able to use the Independent Socialist League as a platform to learn Marxist theory, journalistic writing, and to improve his public speaking skills. He then began to contribute to the youth and cultural magazine Anvil, ultimately becoming an editor of it. As the years went on, Rawick grew increasingly unhappy with the organization as he did not like the direction it was heading. The organization's leftist ideology no longer coincided with his own personal leftist views.

In 1960 and 1961, Rawick slowly joined Facing Reality, a Detroit-based leftist group headed by C. L. R. James. He was exposed to the group by taking socialist study classes. Rawick agreed with the group's view on the class nature of the Soviet Union more than the view of rule by a bureaucratic caste that the Independent Socialist League held. Facing Reality aided in the development of Rawick's views of radical labor and the Black freedom movement.

Travels 
Beginning in 1963 and spanning all the way to 1968, Rawick traveled frequently to London to work with C. L. R. James. On a visit in 1964, James asked Rawick to give a lecture on American history to guests at his home. After Rawick finished, James asked him if he knew anything about the slaves' own reactions of being enslaved. Rawick quickly realized he did not know much about how the slaves' felt, but recalled that there was a collection of interviews done by ex-slaves in the late 1930s. This interaction led to Rawick's monumental work, The American Slave: A Composite Autobiography. Rawick made all of the interviews done by ex-slaves available to students and scholars.

Rawick was exposed to many different viewpoints while visiting James in London. Many African, African American, and West Indian intellectuals would frequent James's estate, with some examples being George Lamming, Aime Cesaire, and Kwame Ture. Rawick began to study race and slavery more seriously after conversing with many Black intellectuals. Rawick was able to see first hand how the group would collaborate and work together while in London.

In 1967, Rawick went on a speaking tour in Germany and Italy. His main talking points were on Black revolt and the capitalist restructuring of the 1930s. He spoke in many cities, including Berlin, Milan, Frankfurt, and Florence. Rawick spoke to thousands of students in universities at every city he visited.

Published works

The American Slave: A Composite Autobiography 
The most enduring achievement of his career was his editorship of the 41-volume set of oral histories of former slaves, titled The American Slave: A Composite Autobiography.  This collection began publication in 1972.  The interviews which this set contains were taken under the auspices of the Works Projects Administration (WPA), a New Deal program. Rawick's methodology of taking testimony from former slaves seriously and using it in his writing revolutionized the study of slavery in the 1970s. He thought that their testimony was as serious as documentary that was left by slaveholders, which was unheard of at the time. They remained in typescript until Rawick took on the task of supervising their preparation for publication.  Volume One of the series consists of Rawick's contribution to the historical literature of American slavery, an important book titled From Sundown to Sunup: The Making of the Black Community.  This book has been translated into 12 languages, and was one of the first books to take American slaves seriously as actors in their own history. His papers are held at the Western Historical Manuscripts Collection at the University of Missouri-St. Louis.

Listening to Revolt: the selected writings of George Rawick 
Listening to Revolt is a collection of twelve of the most influential writings by George Rawick, along with an introduction by David Roediger, and afterwords by Enoch H. Page, Ferruccio Gambino, and George Lipsitz. The work shows Rawick's major contributions to African American history and Marxist social theory. Rawick was able to tie the civil rights movement together with the tradition of class struggle.

David Roediger analyzed primary sources from the George P. Rawick Papers found at the University of Missouri to craft his introduction. Roediger describes the development of Rawick's ideology in radical labor and the Black freedom movement in Detroit and London. Enoch H. Page uses his experience in studying and working with Rawick to contextualize Rawick's capabilities as an oral historian and dialectician. Rawick used his skills to be able to forge relationships with radical African American students and scholars in St. Louis. Ferruccio Gambino writes about Rawick's speaking tour in Italy in 1967. Rawick lectured at universities in front of crowds of radical students and workers. Rawick spoke to them about the civil rights campaign in the United States, and the struggles of workers in Detroit's automobile factories. George Lipsitz was a teaching assistant for Rawick during the 1970s. Lipsitz writes about Rawick's impact as a scholar and activist in the working class struggle, African American resistance, and stopping the spread of white supremacy.

Listening to Revolt was released in 2010, 20 years after the death of George Rawick.

References

External links
George Rawick Archive

1929 births
1990 deaths
American socialists
American Marxist historians
American male non-fiction writers
Marxist writers
Oberlin College alumni
People from Brooklyn
State University of New York faculty
University of Chicago faculty
University of Wisconsin–Madison College of Letters and Science alumni
Washington University in St. Louis faculty
Wayne State University faculty
20th-century American historians
20th-century American male writers
Historians from New York (state)
University of Missouri–St. Louis faculty